Vincent A. Mahler is a professor of Political Science at Loyola University Chicago, where he serves as the Undergraduate Program Director.

Academic history 
Mahler received his B.A. and M.A. from Loyola University Chicago and his PhD from Columbia University. He lives in Park Ridge, Illinois.

Research history 
Mahler's teaching and research interests include comparative social policy, Western European politics, and quantitative methods. His work has been cited by popular media and published in several academic journals.

Mahler has twice been a guest academic at the Luxembourg Income Study, and wrote a book about his research titled Dependency Approaches to International Political Economy.

References

External links
 Luxembourg Income Study

1949 births
Living people
American political scientists
People from Chicago
People from Park Ridge, Illinois
Loyola University Chicago alumni
Columbia University alumni
Loyola University Chicago faculty